Hanau is a town in the Main-Kinzig-Kreis, in Hesse, Germany. It is located 25 km east of Frankfurt am Main and is part of the Frankfurt Rhine-Main Metropolitan Region. Its station is a major railway junction and it has a port on the river Main, making it an important transport centre. The town is known for being the birthplace of Jakob and Wilhelm Grimm and Franciscus Sylvius. Since the 16th century it was a centre of precious metal working with many goldsmiths. It is home to Heraeus, one of the largest family-owned companies in Germany.

Hanau, once the seat of the Counts of Hanau, lost much of its architectural heritage in World War II. A British air raid in 1945 created a firestorm, killing one sixth of the remaining population and destroying 98 percent of the old city and 80 percent of the city overall.

In 1963, the town hosted the third Hessentag state festival. Until 2005, Hanau was the administrative centre of the Main-Kinzig-Kreis. On 19 February 2020, a gunman attacked two bars and a kiosk in Hanau, murdering nine people with roots outside Germany, before shooting his mother and himself.

Geography 
The historic core of Hanau is situated within a semicircle of the river Kinzig which flows into the river Main just west of the town. Today, after a substantial expansion during the 19th and 20th centuries it also extends to the river Main and after a restructuring of municipal borders within Hesse in the 1970s a couple of nearby villages and towns were incorporated. After this change, Hanau for the first time also extended to the south bank of the Main river.

Climate 
On the 0 °C isotherm, Hanau has a humid continental climate as Eastern Germany with warm summer, classified by Köppen as Dfb. In the -3 °C isotherm has oceanic climate (Cfb) with some interior characteristics. Using the first definition used is the city most west of the continent below 200 m at sea level with this category.

Districts 
 Innenstadt (town center)
 Nordwest (northwest) incl. 
 Südost (southeast)
 
 
 
 Großauheim

Name

History

Old town 
As a place of settlement Hanau was first mentioned in 1143. Formerly it was the site of a castle which used the waters of the river Kinzig as a defense. The castle belonged to a noble family, calling themselves "of Hanau" from the 13th century. Starting from this castle a village developed and became a town in 1303. As a result of this history, the main church of Hanau stood outside its walls in the village of Kinzdorf. The villagers moved into the town, Kinzdorf became an abandoned village leaving only the church. Only in the 15th century was the status of the Hanau parish church transferred to the church of Mary Magdalene within the town walls.

Shortly after the first town walls were built at the beginning of the 14th century, the town outgrew this limit. Outside the wall, along the road to Frankfurt am Main a settlement developed (the Vorstadt) which was properly included in the fortifications of Hanau only when Hanau received completely new fortifications in Renaissance-style during the first half of the 16th century. These new fortifications enclosed three elements: The medieval castle, the medieval town of Hanau and the Vorstadt.

New town

Huguenots

In 1597 Count Philipp Ludwig II attracted French Protestants (Huguenots) refugees, who had been admitted to Frankfurt but had only very limited accommodation, to found their own settlement south of Hanau. This happened under the direction of the then guardian of the Hanau count, Johann VI. von Nassau-Dillenburg, who hoped for significant economic and cultural advances from the settlement of the Réfugiés from south-west France. In return for the assurance of free exercise of their religion, the refugees undertook to become economically active in Hanau. Out of this tradition, goldsmiths are still trained in Hanau. Hanau also was the site of the first workshop to produce Faience within Germany. These new citizens were granted privileges and they formed their own community, church and administration for the "new town of Hanau" (Neustadt Hanau) wholly separate from the existing community. A stark contrast to the Catholic Church, but also to the Lutheran Church of the time, was the participation of lay people in church-governing functions, as well as the design of the church, especially the decalogues. Each congregation was led by the Consistoire, elected by congregation members for life, which is roughly comparable to today's church council. The descendants of the French Reformed religious refugees have assimilated in Hanau over time.

Walloon-Dutch refugees and Jews
In contrast to the Huguenots, the Walloon and Dutch Calvinist refugees came from an area of what is now the Netherlands, Belgium and the French Département Nord at the time of Spanish rule, the Spanish Netherlands. With the arrival of the Huguenots, Walloons and Dutch, Hanau's rise to become an important business location began. Until 1821, the new town had its own independent community, independent of the old town. The Reformed Walloon-Dutch community still exists today.

Philipp Ludwig II also allowed Jews to settle in Hanau. From 1604 there was a Jewish community again.

It took more than 200 years to amalgamate both. The new town – larger than the old one – was protected by a then very modern fortification in Baroque-style which proved a big asset only a few years later in the Thirty Years' War. The town survived a siege in 1637 with only minor damage.

The new citizens formed the major economic and political power within the County of Hanau and in 1642 played a leading role in the succession of Count Fredrik Casimir of Hanau Lichtenberg into the County of Hanau-Münzenberg of which the town of Hanau was the capital.

17th century 
During the Thirty Years' War Hanau was taken by the Swedes in 1631. In 1636 it was besieged by the imperial troops, but was relieved on the 13th of June by William V, Landgrave of Hesse-Kassel, on account of which the day is still commemorated by the inhabitants.

18th century 

In 1736 Johann Reinhard III of Hanau-Lichtenberg, the last of the Counts of Hanau, died. Those parts of his county belonging to the County of Hanau-Münzenberg, which included Hanau, were inherited by the Landgrave of Hesse-Kassel. Due to dynastic troubles within this family the County of Hesse-Hanau was created a separate state from the Landgraviate until 1786. So Hanau stayed capital for another 50 years. Even after that it became – after Kassel – the town second in importance within Hesse-Kassel.

19th century 

During the Napoleonic Wars the Emperor himself ordered the fortifications of Hanau to be destroyed. This created a chance for both parts of the town to expand across their traditional limits. In 1813, the Battle of Hanau took place near the city between French troops and Austro-Bavarian forces. During the 1820s the administrations of both towns of Hanau were merged.

With its pre-industrial workshops Hanau became a nucleus of a heavy industrialisation during the 19th century: From within the city (e.g.: Heraeus) as well as from outside (e.g. Degussa, Dunlop). This was heavily supported by its development as an important railway interchange of six railway lines, most of them main lines:
 1848: Frankfurt-Hanau Railway
 1854: Main–Spessart Railway
 1867: Frankfurt–Bebra Railway, eastern direction
 1873: Frankfurt–Bebra Railway, western direction
 1879/1881: Friedberg–Hanau Railway
 1882: Odenwald Railway

Revolution of 1848

1848 Hanau was a centre of the German democratic movement and contributed significantly both in 1830 and in the Revolution of 1848. As part of this movement the German Gymnastic League (Deutscher Turnerbund) was founded here in 1848. Hanau was finally annexed to Prussia like all of Hesse-Kassel in 1866 after its Prince-elector took the Austrian side in the Austro-Prussian War. It remained part of Prussia until 1945.

In the late 19th century Hanau became a major garrison town. Due to its interchange of railway lines a large detachment of military railway-engineers as well as other military units were stationed here.

As a free-trade city, Hanau developed a silver manufacturing industry using fantasy hallmarks. Hanau silver was produced from the mid 19th to the early 20th Century.

20th century 

During World War II, the Jewish population were persecuted with the last Jews being deported in May 1942.

Hanau was for the most part destroyed by British airstrikes in March 1945 a few days before it was taken by the U.S. Army. Around 87% of the town was destroyed. Of 15,000 inhabitants who remained in the city at the time, 2,500 died in the attack.

The town housed one of the largest garrisons of the U.S. Army in Europe. Being an important strategic location in the so called Fulda Gap, the military community had a population of 45,000 military members, U.S. civilians and family members at its peak during the Cold War. The extensive U.S. facilities included Hanau Army Airfield, also known as Fliegerhorst Langendiebach. The garrison was closed in April 2018. Most of the former military areas have been converted to civil use in the meantime.

21st century
In 2010, Hanau started a huge building project to completely redesign the inner city. These are the largest construction works in the town since the reconstruction after World War II.

On 19 February 2020, eleven people—including the perpetrator—were killed in a spree shooting at two shisha bars and a flat in the town. The perpetrator, known as Tobias Rathjen, opened fire at Midnight Bar and Arena Bar in Hanau centre and Kesselstadt. Tobias then drove home, where he killed his mother, and shot himself.

Economy
At present, many inhabitants work in the technological industry Heraeus) or commute to Frankfurt. Frankfurt International Airport is 30 km away.

Population
 With a population of 98,438 it is the sixth most populous town in Hesse. Having lost its status as administrative centre of the Main-Kinzig-Kreis (Main-Kinzig district) to Gelnhausen in 2005, proposals have been made that Hanau should form its own administrative district by 1 April 2021.
 More than 20% of the inhabitants are foreign nationals, mostly Turkish workers.

Jewish community 
The earliest documentary evidence for the presence of Jews in Hanau dates from 1313. In the 17th and 18th centuries Hanau developed into an important center of Hebrew printing. The community numbered 540 persons 1805, 80 families in 1830, 447 persons in 1871, and 657 at the turn of the century. In 1925 there were 568 Jews in Hanau.

Twin towns – sister cities

Hanau is twinned with:

 Conflans-Sainte-Honorine, France
 Dartford, United Kingdom
 Francheville, France
 Nilüfer, Turkey
 Taizhou, China
 Tottori, Japan
 Yaroslavl, Russia

Friendly cities
Hanau also has friendly relations with:
 Waltershausen, Germany
 Pays de Hanau, France

Transport

Rail
Hanau is a transportation hub in Germany, with its main station serving the following lines:
Frankfurt-Hanau Railway (RE / RB 55),
Main-Spessart-Bahn (from Hanau to Aschaffenburg Hauptbahnhof) (RE / RB 55),
Kinzig Valley Railway to Fulda (RE / RB 50),
Frankfurt-Bebraer railway (westbound) to Offenbach Hauptbahnhof, Frankfurt am Main Hauptbahnhof as well as the largely parallel south metropolitan S-Bahn,
Friedberg-Hanau railway (RB 33) and
Odenwaldbahn (RE / RB 64) towards Babenhausen, Groß-Umstadt-Wiebelsbach, Erbach and Eberbach.
 
Besides the main station, the town is also served by Hanau West and Hanau-Wilhelmsbad on the Frankfurt-Hanau Railway, Großauheim on the Main-Spessart-Bahn, Wolfgang an der Kinzigtalbahn, the S-Bahn station at Steinheim (Main) on the South-Main S-Bahn, Hanau Nord at the Hanau-Friedberger Bahn and Hanau-Klein Auheim on the Odenwaldbahn.

Sights
 
  
  (historic spa)
  (St Mary's Church)

Notable people

 Louis Appia (1818–1898), surgeon, member of the Geneva "Committee of Five" (precursor to the International Committee of the Red Cross)
 J. C. C. Devaranne (1784–1813), was born in Hanau on 8 March 1784
 Siegmund Feniger, also known as Nyanaponika Thera, Buddhist monk
 Jürgen Grasmück (1940–2007), author of horror fiction and science fiction stories, born in Hanau in 1940
 The Brothers Grimm (Brüder Grimm) collected many German fairy tales and started work on the German Glossary
 Ludwig Emil Grimm (1790–1863), painter, younger brother of Jacob and Wilhelm
 Solomon Hanau (1687–1746), 17th century Hebrew-language linguistic master
 Hans Daniel Hassenpflug (1794–1862), German statesman
 Paul Hindemith (1895–1963), composer
 Stefan Jagsch (born 1986), extreme-right politician
 Alois Kottmann (1929–2021), violinist, was born in Großauheim
 Johann Peter Krafft (1780–1856), painter
 Moritz Daniel Oppenheim (1800–1882), painter, often regarded as the first Jewish painter of the modern era
 Bodo Sperling (born 1952) is a German painter and conceptual artist.
 Karl Storck (1826–1887), Romanian sculptor, born in Hanau on 30 March 1887
 Hermann Volk (1903–1988), Roman-catholic bishop in Mainz
 Rudi Völler (born 1960), football/soccer world champion 1990 and coach of the German national team, when it was runner-up in 2002
 Wilhelm Wagenfeld (1900–1990), Designer

Sports
 Turngemeinde 1837 Hanau a.V. (TGH), one of the oldest of Germany's sports clubs
 Hanauer Rudergesellschaft 1879 e.V. (HRG), one of Germany's oldest rowing clubs
 1. Hanauer FC 1893 e.V. (Hanau '93), Hesse's oldest association football club

References

External links
 
 
 Official town website 
 HanauOnline Webzine 
 Staatliche Zeichenakademie Hanau (Hanau State Academy) 

 
Main-Kinzig-Kreis
Burial sites of the House of Leiningen
Populated places on the Main basin
Populated riverside places in Germany